The following lists events that happened during 1905 in Chile.

Incumbents
President of Chile: Germán Riesco

Events 

October – Meat riots

Births
date unknown – Roberto Rey (d. 1972)
10 May – Víctor Morales (Chilean footballer) (d. 1938)
25 May – Germán Picó Cañas (d. 1988)
17 August – Jorge Urrutia (d. 1981)

Deaths 
5 October – Carlos Walker Martínez (b. 1842)

References 

 
Years of the 20th century in Chile
Chile